Bob Van Der Veken (26 September 1928 – 18 February 2019) was a Belgian actor.

Early life 
A familiar face on Belgian television, Van Der Veken's career began in 1956. He made well over 100 appearances. One of his most popular roles was that of Paul Thienpondt in the comedy series De Collega's. More recently, he has appeared in such popular Belgian TV series as Spoed, Alle maten, and Lili & Marleen. In 1992, he directed the television series Caravans.

Filmography

2000s
Het is ene van ons (2006) TV Episode .... Meneer Joost
.... Meneer Joost (1 episode, 2006)
Grappa (2006) TV Series .... Opa*"Wet volgens Milo, De" .... Rechter (2 episodes, 2005)
Eiland, Het .... Julien (1 episode, 2004)
Geel! (2004) TV Episode .... Julien
Pista! (2003) (TV) (as Robert van der Veken) .... Bompa
FC de kampioenen .... Paul Tienpondt (2 episodes, 1996–2002)
Spoed .... Jozef Sirou (1 episode, 2002)
Liefde & geluk .... Meneer Vervoort (1 episode, 2001)
Twee straten verder (2000) TV Series .... Man in rolstoel

1990s and earlier
Alle maten .... Aanbidder (1 episode, 1998)
    - De Aanbidder (1998) TV Episode .... Aanbidder
Deman .... Jacques Demeester sr. (1 episode)
    - Moord en brand (????) TV Episode .... Jacques Demeester sr.
Compromissen: De excellentie (1997) .... Bankier
Wittekerke .... Onderzoeksrechter (1 episode, 1996–2001)
    - Episode #3.73 (1996) TV Episode .... Onderzoeksrechter
U beslist .... Opa (1 episode, 1996)
    - Opa's centen (1996) TV Episode .... Opa
She Good Fighter (1995) .... Voorzitter van de rechtbank
Kan dat met gebakken aardappeltjes? (1993) .... Client in restaurant
NMBS promotie (1993) .... Opa op de trein
De Gouden jaren .... Albert (1 episode, 1992)
    - Albert Chérie (1992) TV Episode .... Albert
Caravans (1992) TV Series .... Tilebuis
De Sikh-Story (1992) (TV) .... Politiecommissaris
De Grijze man (1991) (TV) .... Oude man
De Leraarskamer (1991) (TV) .... Vandam
De Vrek (1989) (TV) .... Maître Jacques
... a.k.a. Avare, L' (Belgium: French title)
De Kollega's maken de Brug (1988) .... Paul Tienpondt
... a.k.a. A Three-Day Weekend (Belgium: English title)
... a.k.a. Collègues font le pont, Les (Belgium: French title)
Het Ultieme kerstverhaal (1987) (TV) .... Leo Binnemans
Springen (1985) .... Timothy Tiendepenning
... a.k.a. Jumping (International: English title)
Chorus Angelorum (1985) .... Steenackers
'n Schot in de Roos (1983) .... Pantalone 
Gloriant (1982) (TV) .... Oom Geeraert
De Witte (1980) .... Mon
... a.k.a. Filasse (Belgium: French title)
... a.k.a. Whitey (International: English title)
... a.k.a. Witte van Sichem, De
Tabula rasa (1979) (TV) .... Dielman Sr.
De Collega's .... Paul Thienpondt (2 episodes)
    - Het feest (????) TV Episode .... Paul Thienpondt
    - Met pensioen (????) TV Episode .... Paul Thienpondt
De Beverpels (1978) (TV) .... Von Werhrhahn
De Eerste nowel (1977) (TV) .... Josef
Het Mirakel van St. Antonius (1977) (TV) .... Dokter
... a.k.a. Miracle de Saint-Antoine, Le (Belgium: French title)
De Opkopers (1977) (TV) .... Reparateur
Klare taal (1977) (TV) .... W. Willems
Rubens, schilder en diplomaat (1977) .... Heer X
Tussen wal en schip (1977) TV Series .... Frans
Lieve juffrouw Rosenberg, waarde Mr. Koonig (1977) (TV) .... Mr. Koonig
... a.k.a. Dear Janet Rosenberg, Dear Mister Kooning (International: English title)
In perfecte staat (1977) (TV) .... Politiecommissaris
... a.k.a. in perfekte staat (Belgium: Flemish title)
J.F. Willems (1976) (TV) .... Lezer
De Herberg in het misverstand (1976) (TV) .... Drogist Dilissen
De Danstent (1976) (TV) .... Veldwachter
Prikkelpraatjes (1976) TV Series
Dynastie der kleine luyden (1974) (TV) .... Martijn
Rita's dagdromen (1974) (TV)
Waar de vogeltjes hoesten (1974) .... Getraumatiseerde stadsbewoner
Golden Ophelia (1974) .... Felix Bollen
De Wiskunstenaars (1973) (TV) .... Dr. Urinaal
... a.k.a. Wiskunstenaars of 't gevlugte jufferjte, De (Belgium: Flemish title)
Agamemnon (1973) (TV) .... Koorlid
Een Boerin in Frankrijk (1973) TV Series .... Franse knecht
Rip van Winckle (1973) (TV) .... Rip
Bel de 500 .... Assistant / Mr. Fleuret (2 episodes)
    - Het Diner (????) TV Episode .... Mr. Fleuret
    - Hoofdpijn (????) TV Episode .... Assistant
Bruiloft (1972) (TV) .... De jonge man
... a.k.a. Kleinbürgerhochzeit, Die (Belgium: German title)
Gelukkige familie (1972) (TV) .... Mark
... a.k.a. The Happy Family (International: English title)
Het Levende lijk (1972) (TV) .... Artjemjev de verklikker
Dodendans (1972) (TV) .... De Dood
De Vierde Man (1972) (mini) TV Series .... Inspekteur Keurvels
Het Souterrain (1972) (TV) .... Law
... a.k.a. The Basement (International: English title)
Tijl Uilenspiegel (1971) (TV) .... Koster
Nijd (Hoofdzonde) (1971) (TV)
Kontiki (1971) (TV)
30 zit- en 79 staanplaatsen (1971) .... Eyskens
Christoffel Marlowe (1970) (TV) .... Poley
Nand in eigen land (1970) (TV)
Over mijn lijk (1970) (TV) .... Bob
... a.k.a. Over My Dead Body (International: English title)
De Kleine hut (1969) (TV) .... Philip
... a.k.a. Petite hutte, La (Belgium: French title)
Albert de Deken (1969) (TV) .... Albert De Deken
... a.k.a. Albert Deacon's Discovery (International: English title)
... a.k.a. Late ontdekking van Albert de Deken, De (Belgium: Flemish title)
Ansfred (1969) .... Loketbediende
De Kandidaat (1969) (TV)
Princess (1969) .... President Sextra
Prinses Zonneschijn (1968) (TV) .... Skjald
Kent u de melkweg? (1968) (TV) .... Patient
... a.k.a. Kennen sie die Milchstrasse? (Belgium: German title)
Vier kromme appelbomen (1968) (TV) .... Knock
Beschuldigde sta op .... Bocarmé (1 episode, 1968)
... a.k.a. Hof van Assisen (Belgium: Flemish title: first episodes title)
    - Visart de Bocarmé (1968) TV Episode .... Bocarmé
Hamlet van Stepney Green (1968) (TV) .... Mr. Green
... a.k.a. The Hamlet of Stepney Green (International: English title)
De Zoemende muzikant (1967) (TV) .... Vriend 1
De Man telt niet mee (1967) (TV) .... Eduard
... a.k.a. Mari ne compte pas, Le (Belgium: French title)
Dallas (1967) (TV) .... Journalist 2
... a.k.a. Dallas, 22 November 1963 (Belgium: Flemish title)
Twee is te weinig, drie is te veel (1966) (TV)
De 5de muur (1966) (TV) .... Rank
De Man van het lot (1966) (TV) .... Napoleon
Jeroom en Benzamien (1966) TV Series .... Jean Rosseels
Shirley Holmes (1966) TV Series
Sterf nooit voor je tijd (1965) (TV) .... Bediende
My Fair Lagardère (1965) (TV) .... Cocardasse
De Theaterdirecteur (1965) (TV) .... Chanteoiseau
Robert en Bertrand (1965) (TV) .... Pinkerton
Umataro (1965) (TV)
Luckie Henkie (1964) (TV) .... Goede 'Ik'
Cab. A. Pola (1964) (TV)
Bolero (1964) (TV) .... Gillewaere
De Tijdscapsule (1963) TV Series .... Inspecteur
Het Uur der onschuld (1963) (TV) .... Sason
De Roos en de kroon (1963) (TV) .... Harry Tully
Cupido Dictator (1963) (TV) .... Roland
Er wordt gedanst vannacht (1962) (TV)
Violet (1962) (TV) .... J. Forester
Het Wonderboompje (1962) (TV) .... Schoolmeester
De 3 klaphoeden (1962) (TV) .... Don Dionisio
1 mei ballade (1962) (TV) .... Declamator
Vijgen na Pasen (1962) (TV)
Het Liefdeselixir (1962) (TV) .... Nemorino
Carnaval Marmelade (1962) (TV)
Flikki de Clown (1962) (TV)
Bob Benny Show (1962) (TV) .... Acteur
Het Proces Anderson (1962) (TV) .... J. Davidson
Droomconcert (1961) (TV) .... Zanger
Levende folklore (1961) (TV) .... Nandje
Het Kraminkelpasteitje (1961) (TV) .... Kraminkeltje
Onder moeder's paraplu (1961) (TV) .... Fotograaf
Tijl Uilenspiegel (1961) TV Series .... Francastel
Zieke tegen wil en dank (1961) (TV) .... Harlekijn
Rodeo (1961) (TV) .... Koper
Humoresk (1961) (TV) .... Student
De Ondergang van de Eppie Reina (1961) (TV) .... Scholtens
Een Eiland in het noorden (1961) (TV) .... Jan Hendrik
Het Licht was vals (1960) (TV) .... Hugertje
Anita, My Love (1960) (TV) .... Jongen 1
Heer Halewijn (1960) (TV) .... Iwijn
Dr. Alwetend (1960) (TV) .... Piet
Hoe zotter, hoe liever (1960) .... Bruidegom
... a.k.a. Au plus fou, au mieux (Belgium: French title)
... a.k.a. The Dafter the Better (Belgium: English title)
Uit een boek ontsnapt (1959) (TV) .... TomDe Heks (1959) (TV) .... DuivelDe Schone slaapster (1957) (TV) .... Jacques D'HerraultDe Schone en de roos (1957) (TV) .... PantaloneRoofridder Kanibabilis'' (1956) (TV) .... Faktotum

References

External links
 

Flemish male film actors
Flemish male television actors
1928 births
2019 deaths